Wolfram Menschick (28 October 1937 – 8 December 2010) was a German Catholic church musician, composer and academic teacher. From 1969 to 2002 he was responsible for the church music at Eichstätt Cathedral, also serving the Diocese of Eichstätt as music director and organ expert. He was a bell expert, a member of a national council. From 1986 to 2000, he was a professor at the University of Music and Performing Arts Munich. His compositions, including 36 masses, are frequently performed.

Life and career 

In 1966, he became chorale conductor at St. Georg in Amberg. From 1969 to 2002, he was kapellmeister  at the Eichstätt Cathedral, where he also served as director of church music for the Diocese of Eichstätt. He was also a professor of liturgical organ playing and chorale conducting at the University of Music and Performing Arts Munich from 1986 to 2000.

In the diocese, he was also the expert for bells (Glockensachverständiger) from 1970 to 2002, and in 1972 became a member of the German national council for bells (Beratungsausschuss für das Deutsche Glockenwesen), which was created ecumenically by the Catholic Bishops' Conference and the Protestant Church. In this position, he approved the bells of the restored Frauenkirche in Dresden. On the occasion of his 70th birthday in 2006, he donated a bell for the north tower of Eichstätt Cathedral, dedicated to Benedict of Nursia and also honouring Pope Benedict XVI, who was his friend (as was also the Pope's elder brother, the priest and musician Georg Ratzinger).

Organ planning 

As the organ expert of the Eichstätt diocese from 1969, he planned several instruments.

Private life and death 
Wolfram Menschick and his wife Roswitha had six daughters, including the author  and the violin maker Julia Menschick.

Menschick died in Eichstätt in 2010 at age 73. The requiem was celebrated by Bishop Gregor Maria Hanke.

Recordings 
 Veni Domine – Der Eichstätter Domchor singt zur Weihnacht, choral music for Christmas, Jubilate-Verlag Eichstätt RM 101
 Wolfram Menschick an der Eichstätter Domorgel, organ music, Jubilate-Verlag Eichstätt RM 102
 Ubi caritas et amor, motet, in Ottilia Cappella – Himmelswege (Lieder vom Leben und von der Liebe), eos 2019

Awards 
Menschick was honoured as a member of the Order of the Holy Sepulchre. On his retirement, Bishop Walter Mixa, representing Pope John Paul II, named him a Komtur of the Order of St. Gregory the Great. In 2007, Eichstätt awarded him its citizen's medal. On 23 May 2008, he received an honorary doctorate from the Pontifical Institute of Sacred Music.

Work 
Menschick's choral sacred music is frequently performed.  include:
 36 masses
 Approximately 200 motets and settings of psalms, including extended psalms for soloists, choirs and orchestra
 an oratorio about John of God
 Johannespassion, a setting of the Passion after St John for three soloists and choir a cappella
 a Marian vespers for women's choir, congregation and organ, composed for a visit of Pope Benedict XVI in Altötting in 2007

Menschick continued composing in retirement, including in his final year, 2010, a Missa pro Papa dedicated to Pope Benedict XVI in June, and a motet for All Souls' Day.

References

External links 

 Menschick, Wolfram (in German) Bayerisches Musiker Lexikon Online

Catholic liturgical composers
Knights Commander with Star of the Order of St. Gregory the Great
University of Music and Performing Arts Munich alumni
Academic staff of the University of Music and Performing Arts Munich
20th-century German composers
21st-century German composers
People from Eichstätt
1937 births
2010 deaths
People from Regensburg (district)